Evidence-Based Nursing  is a peer-reviewed healthcare journal covering the field of evidence-based nursing. It is published quarterly by the BMJ Publishing Group and RCN Publishing. It is abstracted and indexed by Index Medicus (MEDLINE), Scopus and Excerpta Medica/EMBASE.

The journal performs systematically searches of nursing and medical journals. The selection of content is determined upon the validity and relevance related to nursing science. Submissions are not accepted and are only commissioned.

External links 
 

General nursing journals
English-language journals
BMJ Group academic journals
Quarterly journals
Publications established in 1998